Charles Augustus Hill (August 23, 1833 – May 29, 1902) was a U.S. Representative from Illinois.

Born in Truxton, New York, Hill attended the common schools and a select school at Griffins Mills. He taught school in Hamburg, New York, and Will County, Illinois. He attended Bell's Commercial College, Chicago, in 1856. He studied law, and was admitted to the bar in Indianapolis, Indiana. He returned to Will County, Illinois, in 1860 and practiced law.

On November 5, 1860, Charles was married to Lydia Melissa Wood, who was born March 11, 1839, in Crete, Illinois. They raised 7 children.

During the Civil War, he enlisted in Company F, Eighth Regiment, Illinois Volunteer Cavalry, in August 1862. He was appointed first lieutenant in the First Regiment, United States Colored Troops. In 1865, he was commissioned captain of Company C of that regiment. He returned to Will County, Illinois, in 1865 and resumed the practice of law in Joliet. Hill was elected prosecuting attorney in 1868 for the counties of Will and Grundy and served four years.

Hill was elected as a Republican to the Fifty-first Congress (March 4, 1889 – March 3, 1891). He was an unsuccessful candidate for reelection in 1890 to the Fifty-second Congress. He resumed the practice of law in Joliet, Illinois. He served as assistant attorney general of Illinois 1897–1900. He died in Joliet, Illinois, May 29, 1902. He was interred in Oakwood Cemetery.

References

1833 births
1902 deaths
People from Truxton, New York
American prosecutors
Illinois lawyers
Union Army officers
People of Illinois in the American Civil War
Republican Party members of the United States House of Representatives from Illinois
19th-century American politicians